Richard Gregory (1923–2010) was a British psychologist.

Richard or Dick Gregory may also refer to: 

Sir Richard Gregory, 1st Baronet (1864–1952), British astronomer
Richard Gregory (rower) (1890–1925), Canadian Olympic rower
Richard I. Gregory, professor at Harvard Medical School 
Dick Gregory (Richard Claxton Gregory, 1932–2017), American comedian and civil rights activist 
Dick Gregory (Canadian football) (Richard Allen Gregory, born 1929), Canadian football player